Colin Roy Robinson (born 15 May 1960) is an English former professional footballer who played as a forward.

Born in Birmingham, Robinson began his football career with local club Mile Oak Rovers before turning professional with Shrewsbury Town in 1982. He was a regular goalscorer with the club before joining Birmingham City in January 1988. Though an injury sustained in his second game caused him to miss the rest of the season, he played regularly in the 1988–89 season, but his goals were insufficient to prevent the club's relegation to the Third Division. Two relatively unproductive seasons with Hereford United, the highlight being scoring the opening goal in Hereford's 2–1 victory over Wrexham in the 1990 Welsh Cup final at Cardiff Arms Park, preceded his moving into non-league football with clubs including Worcester City, Bridgnorth Town, Halesowen Town and Shifnal Town.

References

1960 births
Living people
Footballers from Birmingham, West Midlands
English footballers
Association football forwards
Mile Oak Rovers F.C. players
Shrewsbury Town F.C. players
Birmingham City F.C. players
Hereford United F.C. players
Worcester City F.C. players
Bridgnorth Town F.C. players
Halesowen Town F.C. players
English Football League players